Balu (also Romanized as Bálov, Balu, and Balav) is a village in Rowzeh Chay Rural District of the Central District of Urmia County, West Azerbaijan province, Iran. At the 2006 National Census, its population was 10,524 in 2,274 households. The following census in 2011 counted 12,501 people in 3,200 households. The latest census in 2016 showed a population of 14,058 people in 3,639 households; it was the largest village in its rural district.

References 

Urmia County

Populated places in West Azerbaijan Province

Populated places in Urmia County